The following is a list of the largest cities (over 25,000 inhabitants) in the Russian Empire according to the 1897 Russian Imperial Census.

See also 
 History of Russia (1892–1917)
 List of cities of the Russian Empire in 1840 (in Russian)
 List of cities in the USSR in 1926 (in Russian)
 List of cities and towns in Russia in 2010
 List of renamed cities and towns in Russia

References

This article incorporates information from the Russian Wikipedia.

Russian Empire
Histories of cities in Russia
Demographics of Russia
1897 in the Russian Empire
cities
Local government in the Russian Empire